Soundhog is a pseudonym of Ben Hayes, a Welsh DJ, producer and composer of a number of Bastard Pop songs. Based in North Wales, he is distinguished by his encyclopaedic knowledge of popular music, which he draws on to concoct "A vs B" tracks that often cast familiar pop, hip hop and R&B vocals in a whole new light by using such unlikely "backing bands" as Focus and The Beatles.

Soundhog won critical acclaim for his December 2002 mix for BBC Radio Wales, which was described by its commissioner Adam Walton as "the most astonishing 30 minutes of radio I've ever broadcast".

In recent years he has created the "Radio Soundhog" series of mixes, which merge artists as diverse as Jon Hiseman's Colosseum, 808 State, Can (band), Scorpions, Venetian Snares and Traffic Sound. These have often been broadcast on UK 'alternative' radio station XFM and the BBC.

He released an official 12" single "Curdler" and DJed throughout mainland Europe in 2004. Recent projects have included official remixes for Shelly Poole and Chicago-based electropop duo Microfilm (band). He is also a member of the experimental electronica trio Tauchsieder (along with Stuart McLean and Innes Smith), who have so far released one CD album entitled 'Louder' which features contributions from Colin Newman, Richard X, Tom Ellard and JD Twitch from Optimo.

The name "Soundhog" was taken from a 1970s-era blank cassette-tape made by EMI.

The Freelance Hairdresser
Soundhog is also responsible for a notorious series of tracks released under the pseudonym of The Freelance Hairdresser (a play on the name of Bastard Pop pioneer Freelance Hellraiser), whose most famous creation is "Marshall's Been Snookered" which featured a vocal by rapper Eminem over a ragtime tune used by the BBC as the theme for its "Pot Black" snooker programme ("Black and White Rag" by Winifred Atwell). Although meant as a joke, the track attracted a lot of attention, including a glowing review in The Village Voice. Later this theme was followed up by "Marshall's Been Done To Death" using various UK TV themes segued together as a backing track. Both tracks received major exposure in the summer of 2002 on the Chris Moyles afternoon show on BBC Radio 1, although never credited, and led to a week-long contest in which listeners were invited to create their own tracks along the same lines.

Subsequent releases have been very sporadic, but include a merging of Public Enemy and Herb Alpert, Dizzee Rascal and Chas & Dave, Michael Jackson and 10cc, and Napalm Death versus Electric Six (possibly the shortest mash up ever, lasting around half a second).

The most popular of recent works was a full-length lop-sided hip-hop styled reworking of the track "Machadaynu" by Tony Rudd, originally broadcast as a shorter, spoof song on the BBC television series Look Around You, sung by Kevin Eldon.

External links
soundhog.co.uk

Welsh DJs
Living people
Year of birth missing (living people)